Pajo is a town in Punakha District in Bhutan.

References

External links 
Satellite map at Maplandia.com

Populated places in Bhutan